Michael Paterniti is an American writer known for magazine articles in publications such as Harper's, the New Yorker, GQ, and Esquire, as well as his book The Telling Room (2013).

Paterniti lives in Portland, Maine and was born in Darien, Connecticut.  After his graduation from the University of Michigan, Paterniti pursued a career as an editor and magazine writer.  

Paterniti is the author of "Driving Mr. Albert: A Trip Across America with Einstein's Brain", his account of a cross-country car trip with the pathologist who performed Albert Einstein’s autopsy and Einstein’s brain itself.  The book won the 1998 National Magazine award.

References

External links

Year of birth missing (living people)
Living people
American magazine writers
University of Michigan alumni
Writers from Portland, Maine
People from Darien, Connecticut